Miguel Ángel Ayuso Guixot, MCCJ (born 17 June 1952) is a Spanish prelate of the Catholic Church and an historian of Islam. He has been an official of the Roman Curia since 2012 and an archbishop since 2016.

Pope Francis raised him to the rank of cardinal on 5 October 2019.

Biography
Miguel Ayuso was born in Seville, Spain, on 17 June 1952. On 2 May 1980, he made his perpetual vows as a member of the Comboni Missionaries of the Heart of Jesus. He was ordained as a priest on 20 September 1982. He earned a licentiate in Arabic and Islamic studies at Rome's Pontifical Institute of Arab and Islamic Studies (PISAI) in 1982. He was a missionary in Egypt and Sudan from 1982 to 2002.

Beginning in 1989, he was professor of Islamic studies first in Khartoum, then in Cairo, and then President of PISAI from 2005 to 2012. He led interreligious discussions in Egypt, Sudan, Kenya, Ethiopia, and Mozambique.

He obtained a doctorate in dogmatic theology from the University of Granada in 2000.

On 20 November 2007, Pope Benedict XVI appointed him a consultant to the Pontifical Council for Interreligious Dialogue, and on 30 June 2012, Benedict named him Secretary of that Council. Benedict named him a special auditor at the Synod of Bishops for the Middle East in 2010.

On 29 January 2016, Pope Francis appointed him Titular Bishop of Luperciana. He was ordained on 19 March by the pope himself.

He served as the Vatican's principal representative in restoring dialogue with Grand Imam Ahmed el-Tayeb of Cairo's Al-Azhar mosque, which were curtailed in 2011. He reported that the parties were focused on "joint initiatives to promote peace", the right to religious education, and the issue of religious freedom, looking to an agreement that establishes "the sacrosanct right to citizenship" for all, no matter their religion. His work culminated in the joint statement, the Declaration on Human Fraternity, issued by the Grand Imam and Pope Francis in February 2019 in Abu Dhabi.

Ayuso Guixot has represented the Holy See as a member of the board of directors of the King Abdullah Bin Abdulaziz International Centre for Interreligious and Intercultural Dialogue (KAICIID), a joint initiative of Saudi Arabia, Austria and Spain, since its founding in Vienna in 2012.

On 25 May 2019, Pope Francis appointed him President of the Pontifical Council for Interreligious Dialogue. Pope Francis named him a member of the Congregation for the Oriental Churches on 6 August 2019.

On 5 October 2019, Pope Francis made him Cardinal Deacon of San Girolamo della Carità. He was made a member of the Congregation for the Oriental Churches on 21 February 2020.

See also
Cardinals created by Francis

Notes

References

External links

Profile at Catholic Hierarchy 

1952 births
Living people
Bishops appointed by Pope Francis
Cardinals created by Pope Francis
People from Seville
21st-century Roman Catholic titular archbishops
Historians of Islam
21st-century Spanish historians
21st-century Spanish cardinals
20th-century Spanish Roman Catholic theologians
Roman Catholic missionaries in Egypt
Roman Catholic missionaries in Sudan
Christian scholars of Islam
Spanish academics
21st-century Spanish Roman Catholic theologians
Spanish expatriates in Egypt
Spanish expatriates in Sudan
University of Granada alumni
Pontifical Institute of Arab and Islamic Studies alumni
Academic staff of the Pontifical Institute of Arab and Islamic Studies
Spanish historians of religion
20th-century Spanish historians